Nazeer Hussain University (NHU) is a private university located in Karachi, Sindh, Pakistan. It was established in 2013.

Faculties and Departments 

Faculty of Architecture and Built Environment
Faculty of Business and Management Sciences
Faculty of Engineering Practices and Sciences
Faculty of Pharmacy

See also
Universities in Pakistan

References

External links 
 NUH official website

Universities and colleges in Karachi
Private universities and colleges in Sindh